Aimé Deolet (13 March 1906 – 26 June 1986) was a Belgian racing cyclist. He rode in the 1929 Tour de France.

References

1906 births
1986 deaths
Belgian male cyclists
Place of birth missing